The Embassy of France in Peru is the diplomatic mission of France in Peru.

The current French ambassador to Peru is Marc Giacomini.

History
Both countries established relations in 1826 and have maintained them since. Relations were severed once during World War II with the French State of Philippe Pétain, with Peru instead establishing relations with Free France and normalizing its relations with said government after the war, elevating the relations to embassy level. In 1973, Peru again severed diplomatic relations with France in protest of French nuclear testing in the South Pacific Ocean. The rupture lasted until 1975.

See also
Embassy of Peru, Paris

References

France
Lima
France–Peru relations